The Miquelon Island (Northeast Coast) Important Bird Area is an area of open sea immediately off the coast of Miquelon Island in the small French archipelago of Saint Pierre and Miquelon off the southern coast of Newfoundland in the North Atlantic Ocean. The 4000 ha site lies off the north and east sides of the island from the waters around Cape Miquelon to the eastern side of La Dune isthmus. It has been identified as an Important Bird Area (IBA) by BirdLife International because it supports a wintering population of red-necked grebes.

See also
 Grand Colombier

References

Important Bird Areas of Saint Pierre and Miquelon